Nasser Madani (born 4 July 1940) is an Iranian épée, foil and sabre fencer. He competed in five events at the 1964 Summer Olympics.

References

External links
 

1940 births
Living people
Iranian male épée fencers
Olympic fencers of Iran
Fencers at the 1964 Summer Olympics
Iranian male foil fencers
Iranian male sabre fencers
20th-century Iranian people